This is a list of universities in the British Virgin Islands.

Universities 
 H. Lavity Stoutt Community College
 University of the West Indies - BVI campus
 Commonwealth Open University - BVI (UK)
  Ballsbridge University Curacao - BVI(International)

See also 
 List of universities by country

References

British Virgin Islands
Virgin Islands
Lists of organisations based in the British Virgin Islands